Charles Antoine Adam Goutzwiller (September 3, 1819 –February 2, 1900) was a French art historian and engraver.
At the Altkirch's college, he was the first professor of drawing of the painter Jean-Jacques Henner, who executed his portrait in 1891.

Publications 
  « X. Hommaire de Hell. Étude biographique », in Revue d'Alsace, Colmar, 1860 (p. 337, 385, 469 et 529) et 1861 (p. 69 et 145)
 Le Musée de Colmar : Notice sur les peintures de Martin Schongauer et de divers artistes des anciennes écoles allemandes,  C. Decker, Colmar, 1867, 80 p.
 Le Comté de Ferrette : esquisses historiques, 1868 (domaine publique disponible en téléchargement libre :https://archive.org/details/LeComtDeFerrette) 
 Curiosités alsaciennes. Les vases de Ribeauvillé, Impr. de Vve L. L. Bader, Mulhouse, 1872, 28 p.
 « Le retable de Luemschwiller », in Revue alsacienne, 1886, no. 6
 Souvenirs d'Alsace, portraits, paysages : à travers le passé, Impr. nouvelle, Belfort, 1898, 475 p., at Gallica

Gallery

References

External links

1819 births
1900 deaths
19th-century engravers
19th-century French people
French engravers
French art historians
Painters from Alsace